Laurance Browning VanMeter (born August 28, 1958) is an American lawyer serving as the chief justice of the Kentucky Supreme Court.

Early life and education

VanMeter was born in 1958 in Lexington, Kentucky and was raised in Winchester. He earned his undergraduate degree in history from Vanderbilt University in 1980 and his Juris Doctor from the University of Kentucky College of Law in 1983.

Legal career and state court service
He practiced law with the firm of Stoll, Keenon & Park from 1983 to 1994. From 1994 to 1999, he was district court judge for Division 1 of the 22nd Judicial District, serving Fayette County. In 1999, he was appointed to the Fayette County Circuit Court bench, where he served until his election to the Kentucky Court of Appeals.

He was elected to the Kentucky Court of Appeals in November 2003 and served there until his elevation to the Supreme Court. He was named as acting Chief Judge of the Court of Appeals in 2010.

Kentucky Supreme Court service
In 2015 VanMeter announced his candidacy for a spot on the Supreme Court due to the retirement of Mary C. Noble. He faced off against fellow Appeals Court Judge Glenn Acree on November 8, 2016 and won 74% of the vote. He was sworn as a justice of the Supreme Court on February 7, 2017.

In November 2022, he was elected to serve as chief justice following the retirement of John D. Minton Jr.. His term as chief justice began on January 2, 2023. He was sworn into office on January 9, 2023, by Minton.

Personal life
VanMeter and his late wife, Lucy, are the parents of four children. He is a member of the Federalist Society. He is a registered Republican.

References

External links
Official Biography on Kentucky Supreme Court website

|-

1958 births
21st-century American judges
Chief Justices of the Kentucky Supreme Court
Federalist Society members
Judges of the Kentucky Court of Appeals
Justices of the Kentucky Supreme Court
Kentucky lawyers
Kentucky Republicans
Living people
People from Lexington, Kentucky
University of Kentucky College of Law alumni
Vanderbilt University alumni